Paul Émile Bienaimé (6 July 1802 – 17 January 1869) was a 19th-century French composer.

Biography 
In 1822 he won the prize in harmony and in 1825, was laureate of a competition of musical composition organised by the Conservatoire with a four-act fugue and finished in second place of the prix de Rome with his cantata Herminie in 1826.

In 1827, he succeeded Pierre Desvignes as kapellmeister at Notre-Dame de Paris where he would play most of his sacred works, such as the Requiem in 1830 with large orchestra in honor of Louis XVI and Marie-Antoinette.

With François-Antoine Habeneck he founded the "Société des concerts du Conservatoire" in 1828. His position at Notre-Dame was abolished after the July Revolution. He then devoted himself to teaching at the Conservatory in the classes of harmony and accompaniment, which he left in 1864 to retire.

Works 
He wrote sacred music, works for salon, an orchestral overture and books on music education (Cinquante études d'harmonie pratique, Paris, 1844).

1842: Les Écoliers de Paris, nocturne, lyrics by Jules Turgan
1842: Vole, ma noire gondole, melody, lyrics by Jules Turgan
1846: Théodie, songbook with several voices on Sacred History
1850: Les Papillons d'or, valse for piano four-hands, op.11
1855: Nérina !, polka-mazurka for piano
1856: Le Gâteau des Rois, ballade for barytone, lyrics by Edmond de Faulques
1857: Le Petit ange, romance, lyrics by Eugène Mahon
1858: Fleur de Bohême, polka for piano
1859: Ave Regina coelorum. Antienne à la Vierge. À quatre voix
1866: Éloge de la paresse, ditty, lyrics by Antignac
1869: L'Enfant et le passereau, arranged by par F. Morand, lyrics by Spenner
1869: Mai, couplets à trois voix égales, 1857, later arranged with accompaniment with piano by F. Morand, lyrics by Spenner
undated: Chant français à l'occasion du Sacre de Charles X, lyrics by Octave Uzanne
undated: Le Départ de la goélette, ditty, lyrics by Poisson
undated: Fugue à huit voix réelles
undated: Priez Dieu, romance, lyrics by Poisson

Bibliography 
 Louis Gustave Vapereau, Dictionnaire universel des contemporains, vol. 1, 1858, (p. 199) 
 Théodore Lassabathie, Histoire du Conservatoire impérial de musique, 1860, (p. 426)

French composers
1802 births
Musicians from Paris
1869 deaths